Sarcozona bicarinata, commonly known as ridged noon-flower, is species of flowering plant in the family Aizoaceae and is endemic to Australia. It is a small shrub with leaves that are triangular in cross-section and arranged in opposite pairs, and daisy-like flowers with twenty to fifty-five petal-like staminodes and twenty to fifty stamens.

Description
The leaves are triangular in cross-section but with the sides rounded and the top flat, the edges tinged with pink. The flowers are arranged singly or in pairs with two leaves fused together and partly enclosing the flowers.

Taxonomy
Sarcozona bicarinata was first formally described in 1969 by Stanley Thatcher Blake in Contributions from the Queensland Herbarium from specimens collected by R.L. Specht near Lock in South Australia.

Distribution
Ridged noon-flower occurs on the Yorke and Eyre Peninsulas and there are records from the Swan Coastal Plain biogeographic region in Western Australia.

Conservation status
This species is classified as in Western Australia as "Priority Three" by the Government of Western Australia Department of Parks and Wildlife meaning that it is poorly known and known from only a few locations but is not under imminent threat.

References

bicarinata
Taxa named by Stanley Thatcher Blake
Plants described in 1969
Flora of South Australia
Flora of Western Australia